Joseph Richard Lamonde (born June 22, 1948, died November 18, 2021) was a former Chaplain of the United States Marine Corps who served from 1978 in a number of posts, including as Chaplain of the United States Marine Corps Forces, Pacific from 1998 to 2000. He was awarded several times for his service, those awards include the Legion of Merit with two award stars, the Meritorious Service Medal with two award stars, the Joint Service Commendation Medal, the Navy and Marine Corps Commendation Medal with two award stars and the Navy and Marine Corps Achievement Medal.

Biography
A native of Pittsburgh, Pennsylvania, Lamonde was ordained a Roman Catholic priest by Bishop Vincent Leonard on May 4, 1974. He received his B.A. degree from Saint Francis College and his M.Div. degree from the Saint Francis School of Theology in Loretto, Pennsylvania. Lamonde was named an Honorary Prelate with the title of Reverend Monsignor by Pope John Paul II.

Career
Lamonde joined the United States Navy Chaplain Corps in 1978.

Following the war, he was stationed at Guantanamo Bay Naval Base before being named Chaplain of the United States Marine Corps Forces, Pacific. He held the position of Chaplain of the United States Marine Corps from 1998 to 2000.

Awards he has received include the Legion of Merit with two award stars, the Meritorious Service Medal with two award stars, the Joint Service Commendation Medal, the Navy and Marine Corps Commendation Medal with two award stars and the Navy and Marine Corps Achievement Medal.

See also

References

1948 births
Living people
Saint Francis University alumni
Religious leaders from Pittsburgh
American Roman Catholic priests
United States Navy officers
United States Navy chaplains
United States Navy personnel of the Gulf War
Chaplains of the United States Marine Corps
Recipients of the Legion of Merit